Moses Warren (December 4, 1779 – February 6, 1845) was an American politician from New York.

Life
Born in Peterborough, Hillsborough County, New Hampshire, Warren was the son of Daniel Warren (1752–1833) and Abigail (Drury) Warren (1751–1840). In 1806, he removed to Hoosick, New York. In 1820, he made a well-received proposal to split the state of New York into legislative districts. He was Sheriff of Rensselaer County from 1821 to 1825.

He was a member of the New York State Senate (3rd D.) from 1828 to 1831, sitting in the 51st, 52nd, 53rd and 54th New York State Legislatures.

He died at Troy, New York. A year after his death, His third son, also named Moses Warren, was appointed to a judgeship in Troy.

References

Sources
The New York Civil List compiled by Franklin Benjamin Hough (pages 127f, 147 and 405; Weed, Parsons and Co., 1858)
The History of Dublin, NH (Boston, 1855; pg. 410)

1779 births
People from Peterborough, New Hampshire
Sheriffs of Rensselaer County, New York
New York (state) state senators
People from Hoosick, New York
Politicians from Troy, New York
1845 deaths